Mario Gestri (11 February 1924 – 4 December 1953) was an Italian road cyclist.

Gestri finished last at the 1950 Giro d'Italia, earning the Maglia nera and competed in three other editions of the race.  He continued racing into 1953, where he found moderate success.  He died in 1953 in a motorcycle accident.

References

Italian male cyclists
1924 births
1953 deaths
Motorcycle road incident deaths
Road incident deaths in Italy
Sportspeople from the Province of Pistoia
Cyclists from Tuscany